Bitis peringueyi, also known as the Peringuey's adder, Peringuey's desert adder or desert sidewinding adder, is a venomous viper species found in Namibia and southern Angola. No subspecies are currently recognized.

Description

The head is short and flat with eyes located on top of the head. The head is covered with strongly keeled scales, the smallest of which are located anteriorly. The eyes are separated by six to 9 scales, while each eye is surrounded by 10-13 scales. Two to four scales separate the suborbitals from the supralabials. The latter number 10-14, the sublabials 10-13. The one pair of chin shields contact the first two to four sublabials.

The dorsal scales number 23-31 at midbody and 21-27 anteriorly. All are strongly keeled, except those bordering the ventral scales are large and smooth. The ventrals number 117-144. The 15-30 subcaudals are usually keeled, particularly towards the tip. The anal plate is single.

The color pattern consists of a pale buff, chestnut brown to orange-brown, or sandy-grayish ground color, overlaid with three longitudinal series of faint, elongate, gray to dark spots. The body is also stippled with an irregular pattern of pale and dark spots. The belly is usually whitish or dirty yellow. The tail is generally tan, but in 25% of specimens, it is black.

Common names
Common names for B. peringueyi include Peringuey's adder, Peringuey's desert adder, sidewinding adder, Jack Carlin, Namib dwarf sand adder, dwarf puff adder, Namib desert sidewinding adder,Jack Carlin dwarf sand adder, Namib dwarf adder, and Namib desert viper.

Etymology
This adder, B. peringueyi, was named after Louis Péringuey, the South African entomologist and museum director.

Geographic range
Bitis peringueyi is found in the Namib from southern Angola to Lüderitz, Namibia. Also seen in the Fish River Canyon.

The type locality is given as "Damaraland, 10 miles east of Walfisch Bay" [Namibia].

Behavior
An ambush hunter, B. peringueyi buries itself just beneath the surface of the sand with only its eyes and the tip of its tail exposed (individuals with black tail-tips employ caudal luring). When prey happens by, it is seized and envenomated.

Feeding
The diet of B. peringueyi includes the lizards Meroles, and the barking gecko Ptenopus. Aporosaura lizards have high water contents and are important sources of water for these snakes.

References

Further reading

Boulenger GA (1888). "On new or little-known South-African Reptiles". Annals and Magazine of Natural History, Sixth Series 2: 136-141. (Vipera peringueyi, new species, p. 141).
Boulenger GA (1896). Catalogue of the Snakes in the British Museum (Natural History). Volume III., Containing the ... Viperidæ. London: Trustees of the British Museum (Natural History). (Taylor and Francis, printers). xiv + 727 pp. + Plates I-XXV. (Bitis peringueyi, p. 495).
Branch, Bill. (2004). Field Guide to Snakes and o+ther Reptiles of Southern Africa. Third Revised edition, Second impression. Sanibel Island, Florida: Ralph Curtis Books. 399 pp. . (Bitis peringueyi, p. 119 + Plate 14).
Golay P, Smith HM, Broadley DG, Dixon JR, McCarthy C, Rage J-C, Schätti B, Toriba M (1993). Endoglyphs and Other Major Venomous Snakes of the World. A Checklist. Geneva: Azemiops. xv + 478 pp. 
Reiserer RS, DeNardo DF (2000). "Natural history observations on Bitis peringueyi (Boulenger) (Reptilia: Viperidae)". Cimbebasia 16: 195-198. PDF at Vanderbilt University. Accessed 18 March 2007.

External links

 . Accessed 28 May 2007.

peringueyi
Snakes of Africa
Reptiles of Angola
Reptiles of Namibia
Reptiles described in 1888
Taxa named by George Albert Boulenger